Paschalis Seretis (born 7 June 1967) is a Greek former professional footballer who played as a striker or midfielder.

Career
Born in Serres, Seretis began playing youth football with a club in Ampelokipoi, Thessaloniki. Soon after, he was signed to PAOK FC's youth academy and would turn professional with the club at age 18.

Honours
 Bundesliga 3rd place: 1995.

References

Living people
1967 births
Association football midfielders
Association football forwards
Greek footballers
Footballers from Serres
PAOK FC players
Xanthi F.C. players
Apollon Pontou FC players
Doxa Drama F.C. players
SC Freiburg players
FC Energie Cottbus players
Super League Greece players
Bundesliga players
2. Bundesliga players
Greek expatriate footballers
Expatriate footballers in Germany
Greek expatriate sportspeople in Germany